The Northamptonshire Football Association, also simply known as the Northamptonshire FA, is the governing body of football in the English county of Northamptonshire.

Organisation

The purpose of the Northamptonshire FA is to lead the successful development of football within the county and to increase the participation, quality and enjoyment of football.

The Northamptonshire FA's strategy sets out the vision, key priorities and targets for investment into grassroots football from 1 July 2008 until 30 June 2012. The strategy contributes to the delivery of The FA's National Game Strategy over a four-year period.

The Northamptonshire FA football development team provide support and guidance to aid development in the game, whatever an organisation or person's role may be. Whereas the football governance team are involved in the day to day running of key areas such as the administration of clubs, leagues and referees along with the running of the discipline process, county competitions and the representative teams.

Affiliated Leagues

Men's Saturday Leagues
United Counties League**
Peterborough and District League**
Northamptonshire Combination Football League**
Northampton Town Football League**

Footnote: **Part of the English football league system.

Men's Sunday Leagues
Daventry & District Sunday League
Kettering Area Sunday League
Northants Sunday Combination
Northants Sunday Conference
Peterborough & District Sunday League]
Peterborough Sunday Morning League
Rushden & District Sunday League

Ladies and Girls Leagues
Northamptonshire Women's and Girls' Football League

Youth Leagues
Countywide U18 Football League
Kettering Weetabix Youth League
Northampton & District Youth Alliance
Northants Senior Youth League
Peterborough & District Junior Alliance
Peterborough & District Youth League
Peterborough Mini-Soccer Conference League

Other Leagues
Northamptonshire Disability League

Small Sided Leagues
Champion Soccer
Football Mundial
Ladies Leagues
Robert Windle Tournaments

Futsal Leagues
Northamptonshire FA Youth Futsal League

Source:

Disbanded or Amalgamated Leagues

A number of leagues that were affiliated to the Northamptonshire FA have disbanded or amalgamated with other leagues including:

Central Northants Combination (in 1991 became the Northamptonshire Combination League)
Central Village League (merged with the Mid Northants League in 1953 to become the Northamptonshire Combination League)
East Northants League (later known as the Rushden & District League)
Kettering Amateur League (became the East Midlands Alliance)
Mid Northants League (merged with the Central Village League in 1953 to become the Northamptonshire Combination League)
Northamptonshire League (abbreviated Northants League and eventually became the United Counties League)
Rushden & District League (previously known as the East Northants League)
South East Northants League

Affiliated Member Clubs

Among the notable clubs that are (or were at one time) affiliated to the Northamptonshire FA are:

Other member clubs include:

County Cup Competitions

The Northamptonshire FA run the following Cup Competitions:

Source

Northamptonshire Cup

The Northamptonshire Cup (known as The Maunsell Cup) is a county cup competition involving senior teams affiliated to the Northamptonshire Football Association.

Northamptonshire Senior Cup

The Northamptonshire Senior Cup (renamed The Hillier Senior Cup in 1981) is a county cup competition involving senior teams affiliated to the Northamptonshire Football Association.

List of Northamptonshire Junior Cup Winners

Source:

List of Northamptonshire Lower Junior Cup Winners

Source:

List of Northamptonshire Area Cup Winners

Source:

References

External links

County football associations
Football in Northamptonshire